Dirt Track Racing is a video game by the now defunct developer Ratbag Games. It is the first game in the series, which includes Dirt Track Racing, Dirt Track Racing: Sprint Cars, and Dirt Track Racing 2.

Reception

The game received "average" reviews according to the review aggregation website GameRankings. GameSpot said, "Even with all of Dirt Track Racing'''s finer points, it's hard to overlook its repetitive tracks and racing events." IGN was positive, saying, "Ratbag proves once again that they are the Kings of racing sims, even the bargain brand."

The game won Computer Games Strategy Plus'' 1999 "Racing Game of the Year" award. The editors wrote, "It humbles more expensive products with over 30 tracks and dozens of cars, excellent physics ... and plenty of tuning options."

References

External links
Ratbag Games Last version of Ratbag Games official website reproduced by Australian video game website Sumea for archives purposes.

1999 video games
Racing video games
Racing video games set in the United States
Video games developed in Australia
Windows games
Windows-only games
Multiplayer and single-player video games
WizardWorks games